Ernest Butler (born 28 August 1924) was an English footballer who made 42 appearances in the Football League playing as an outside right for Southend United and Darlington. He also played non-league football for Stockton.

References

1924 births
Possibly living people
Footballers from Middlesbrough
English footballers
Association football wingers
Stockton F.C. players
Southend United F.C. players
Darlington F.C. players
English Football League players